Marine Corps Air Facility Corvallis is a former United States Marine Corps facility located four nautical miles (5 mi, 7 km) southwest of the central business district of Corvallis, a city in Benton County, Oregon, United States.

History 

The site was built during World War II by the United States Army Air Forces for bomber training.  The original hangar is still being used today. After its closure, it was turned over to the city and reopened as Corvallis Municipal Airport.

See also 

 Oregon World War II Army Airfields
 List of United States Marine Corps installations

References

External links 
 Aerial image as of May 1994 from USGS The National Map

Airfields of the United States Army Air Forces in Oregon
Corvallis
World War II airfields in the United States
1940s establishments in Oregon
1940s disestablishments in Oregon